Rettig (nickname of the greengrocer or radish farmer) is a surname. Notable people with the surname include:

Alvin Rettig (born 1963), American former Arena football fullback/linebacker 
Charles P. Rettig (born 1956), American attorney serving as Commissioner of Internal Revenue
Chase Rettig (born 1991), American football quarterback for Boston College
Haviv Rettig, Israeli-American journalist
James R. Rettig (1950–2022), American librarian and former president of the American Library Association (2008–2009)
Lorna Rettig, English curler, participated in the 2010 European Curling Championships – Women's tournament as a member of England's group B team
Otto Rettig (1894–1977), American baseball pitcher
Raúl Rettig (1909–2000), Chilean politician and lawyer
Tommy Rettig (1941–1996), American child actor and computer software engineer and author

Fictional characters:
 Lancer Rettig, fictional character in the novel Endymion by Dan Simmons

See also
8474 Rettig, main-belt asteroid
Rettig Report, 1991 report on human rights abuses in Chile under Augusto Pinochet
Krzan, Poland (German: Rettig), a village in Greater Poland
Rettig ICC, manufacturer of heating systems 

German-language surnames
Surnames from nicknames
Occupational surnames